Leandro Deyrinio Kappel (born 14 November 1989) is a professional footballer who plays as a striker for Turkish club Pendikspor. Born in the Netherlands, he plays for the Suriname national team.

Besides the Netherlands, he has played in Greece, Portugal, and Turkey.

International career
Born in the Netherlands, Kappel is of Surinamese descent. He debuted with the Surinamese national team in a friendly 1–0 loss to Thailand on 27 March 2022.

References

External links

 

1989 births
Footballers from Amsterdam
Dutch sportspeople of Surinamese descent
Living people
Surinamese footballers
Suriname international footballers
Dutch footballers
Association football forwards
FC Volendam players
Doxa Drama F.C. players
S.C. Braga players
S.C. Braga B players
Panetolikos F.C. players
Denizlispor footballers
Altay S.K. footballers
Pendikspor footballers
Super League Greece players
Primeira Liga players
Liga Portugal 2 players
TFF First League players
Süper Lig players
Surinamese expatriate footballers
Dutch expatriate footballers
Expatriate footballers in Greece
Surinamese expatriate sportspeople in Greece
Dutch expatriate sportspeople in Greece
Expatriate footballers in Portugal
Surinamese expatriate sportspeople in Portugal
Dutch expatriate sportspeople in Portugal
Expatriate footballers in Turkey
Surinamese expatriate sportspeople in Turkey
Dutch expatriate sportspeople in Turkey